Brenda Rojas (born 15 October 1995) is an Argentine Olympic canoeist. She represented her country at the 2016 Summer Olympics. She also competed at the 2020 Summer Olympics.

She competed at the 2019 Pan American Games, in Women K2 500m, winning a silver medal, and Women K4 500m, winning a bronze medal.

References

External links

1995 births
Living people
Argentine female canoeists
Canoeists at the 2016 Summer Olympics
Olympic canoeists of Argentina
Pan American Games medalists in canoeing
Pan American Games bronze medalists for Argentina
Canoeists at the 2015 Pan American Games
Canoeists at the 2019 Pan American Games
Medalists at the 2015 Pan American Games
Medalists at the 2019 Pan American Games
Canoeists at the 2020 Summer Olympics
People from Neuquén Province
21st-century Argentine women